Volgin is a Russian surname derived from the river Volga.

It can refer to:
 Andrei Volgin (football)
 Viacheslav Petrovich Volgin, (1879-1962), Russian historian
 Volgin, nom de guerre of the revolutionary and Marxist theorist Georgi Plekhanov
 Yevgeny Borisovitch Volgin - one of the antagonists in the video game Metal Gear Solid 3: Snake Eater
Alexandra Volgina

Russian-language surnames